The Whitewater Kings are a Canadian junior ice hockey team from Cobden, Ontario. The Kings play in the Eastern Ontario Junior Hockey League.  Between 2014-15 and the end of the 2019-2020 seasons, the EOJHL and the CCHL set a new agreement  in an attempt to create a better player development model. This resulted in the league re-branding itself as the Central Canada Hockey League Tier 2 (CCHL2), and shrinking to 16 teams and two divisions. The league reverted to the Eastern Ontario Junior Hockey League for 2021. Prior to the 2017–18 season, the Whitewater Kings were known as the Prescott Flyers that started as a member of the Eastern Ontario Junior Hockey League.

History
The franchise was formed in 1971 as the Cardinal Broncos from Cardinal, Ontario.  In the early 1980s, future National Hockey League player Todd Gill started his junior hockey career with the Broncos.

In 1983, the Broncos moved to Grenville County, Ontario and formed the South Grenville Rangers.  Finding themselves in the tight Rideau Division of the Eastern Ontario Junior B Hockey League, the Rangers were never able to gain a division title.  Very often, in the 2000s, the Rangers were locked out of a playoff berth by their division opponents.  In 2005, the Rangers finished 1st in their division with 70 points just to bail out in the first round of the playoffs.  In 2006, the Rangers finished 2nd in the Rideau Division with 66 points and made it to the divisional final only to lose.

In the summer of 2013, the Rangers were renamed the Prescott Flyers.

For the 2015–16 season the EOJHL became affiliated with the Central Canada Hockey League with a goal to establish a more linear advancement for players. The EOJHL became the Central Canada Hockey League Tier 2 (CCHL2).

During the 2017 off-season the Flyers franchise was purchased by Dale McTavish and relocated to Cobden, Ontario, to serve as part of the development system for the Pembroke Lumber Kings of the CCHL.

Season-by-season results

Notable alumni
Todd Gill

References

External links
http://whitewaterkings.pointstreaksites.com/view/whitewaterkings/home-page

Ice hockey teams in Ontario
Ice hockey clubs established in 1971
1971 establishments in Ontario